The 1976–77 Rugby Union County Championship was the 77th edition of England's County Championship rugby union club competition.

Lancashire won their 10th title after defeating Middlesex in the final.

First Round

Second Round

Semi finals

Final

See also
 English rugby union system
 Rugby union in England

References

Rugby Union County Championship
County Championship (rugby union) seasons